The Porsche Panamera is a mid/full-sized luxury car (E-segment or F-segment for LWB in Europe) manufactured and marketed by German automobile manufacturer Porsche across two generations using a front-engine, rear or all-wheel drive configuration.

Porsche debuted the production first generation Panamera at the 13th Auto Shanghai International Automobile Show in April 2009, launching hybrid and diesel versions in 2011. In April 2013, the company introduced a facelifted model, again at the Shanghai Auto Show, followed by the US introduction of a plug-in hybrid version, the Panamera S E-Hybrid, in November 2013. Porsche introduced the second generation Panamera in 2016.

The Panamera name, as with the Carrera name, derives from the Carrera Panamericana race.

Concept 

Though the Panamera's shape and profile recall the 911,  where the 911 has a tight, performance-focused interior,  the Panamera features commodious dimensions with technological, luxury-oriented amenities.

Production 
Engines are first assembled in Stuttgart, and the car's body is built, painted and  assembled in Leipzig, Germany, alongside the Cayenne (until 2017) and Macan. From 2009 to 2016, the bodies were built at the Volkswagen Group facility in Hannover.

Production began in April 2009, one month after its debut in the Shanghai Motor Show in China.

First generation (970 Chassis G1; 2009–2016) 

The V8-powered Panamera S, 4S, and Turbo models were the first versions that debuted in 2009. In addition to the 4.8L Twin Turbo  V8 powered models, Porsche launched two further models in 2010: the Panamera and Panamera 4 which are both powered by 3.6-litre V6 engines producing .

Being derived from the V8 engine of the Panamera S and Panamera 4S, the V6 retains the V8's technologies like Direct Fuel Injection, infinitely variable intake camshaft adjustment with variable valve lift (VarioCam Plus), an on-demand oil pump, water cooling with thermal management, a variable intake manifold, as well as integrated dry sump lubrication with two-stage extraction of oil, and an Auto Start-Stop function (only with the PDK transmission). Turbo version uses active aerodynamics with a multi-stage, adjustable rear spoiler.

In 2011, the Panamera S Hybrid, Diesel, Turbo S, and GTS variants were added to the range. The GTS achieves a lateral acceleration of 0.96g.

The Panamera, S, Hybrid and Diesel models are rear-wheel drive, while the Panamera 4, 4S, and GTS have the same four-wheel drive system as the Turbo and Turbo S, called Porsche Traction Management (PTM).

The Panamera featured Adaptive air suspension, the Porsche Dynamic Chassis Control (PDCC), active anti-roll bars and the Porsche Active Suspension Management (PASM).

Engines

Transmissions 
The newly introduced ZF 7-speed PDK dual clutch transmission was standard on the Panamera 4, 4S and Turbo models. 
The addition of the optional sport chrono package provided faster acceleration times. 
The S Hybrid and Diesel models had an Aisin-supplied eight-speed automatic transmission called the Tiptronic S.
In some markets between 2009 and 2013 Porsche offered 6-speed manual transmission for the V6 N/A and V8 N/A, all with rear wheel drive. Global production with the 6-speed manual was only 50 with V6 and 96 with V8.

Panamera Turbo S 
The engine of the Panamera Turbo S features larger turbochargers than the standard Panamera Turbo's 4.8-litre V8, as well as high-pressure fuel injection, and aluminium-alloy pistons. The piston rings are coated in a low-friction surface to help eke out even more performance. Roll-on acceleration should be more impressive, changes to the PDK (Porsche Doppelkupplung) gearbox allow for faster gearshifts, and the alleged 27.7mpg fuel economy is no worse than the less powerful Panamera Turbo.
 Drag Coefficient: 0.30
 : 3.3 seconds
 : 7.2 seconds
 1/4 mile: 11.5 seconds at 
 Braking  to :

Panamera S Hybrid 

In 2008, Porsche AG announced the development of a parallel hybrid system for the Panamera, and in February 2011, Porsche unveiled the Panamera S Hybrid.

Deliveries began in the United States in 2011, and cumulative sales reached 684 units through March 2013.

Panamera Diesel 
The Panamera Diesel was launched in May 2011. The vehicle utilized the same Audi 3.0L V6 engine used in the Cayenne Diesel, which was itself a tuned carryover of an existing engine. It was also the most economical Porsche in the then entire Porsche vehicle lineage, consuming just 6.3 litres per 100 kilometres (37 US MPG/45 UK MPG).

Special editions 

In October 2012, Porsche introduced the Panamera Platinum Edition. The exterior of the Panamera Platinum Edition was enveloped in one of five basic colours – black, white, basalt black, carbon grey metallic, and mahogany metallic. It included more standard equipment, larger wheels, and an exclusive interior leather combination of luxor beige and black. It was be offered with rear and all wheel drive layouts, and had a  acceleration time of under 5.8 seconds or faster on all variants. Exclusive equipment included the special interior combination, platinum rear overhang and front lower grille, platinum door sills, and platinum mirrors. The finalizing touch to this special edition included an exclusive set of 19-inch Panamera Turbo alloy wheels with the red, black, and gold Porsche crest.

In March 2015, Porsche announced that they were releasing a new special edition Panamera called the "Panamera Edition". The car is based on the base Panamera and includes high-gloss black trim strips outline the windows, 19-inch Panamera Turbo wheels with coloured centre caps, the sills were inscribed with the word "Edition," and body-coloured door handles were an additional add on when the customer chose the Porsche Entry & Drive option. The Panamera Edition cost US$80,000.

2013 facelift 

Porsche announced its updated Panamera on 3 April 2013, with a scheduled formal launch at Auto Shanghai. The revised model can be identified by new front and rear bumpers. Technical changes included the addition of a new 3.0L twin-turbocharged Panamera S and a new E-Hybrid model. A long wheelbase version with an additional 150 mm was available for selected left-hand drive markets. The Turbo S version followed up in 2014. The long wheelbase versions were only available on 4S, Turbo, and Turbo S models.

Engines

Panamera S E-Hybrid 

As part of the 2013 Panamera facelift, Porsche announced the introduction of a plug-in hybrid model, the Panamera S E-Hybrid. The plug-in version was unveiled at the April 2013 Shanghai Auto Show. The plug-in electric hybrid had a 9.4 kWh lithium-ion battery pack capable of delivering a range of more than  under the New European Driving Cycle (NEDC) standard. The battery could be fully charged in approximately 2 hours from a 240 V power source.

EPA fuel economy ratings

Markets and sales
The Panamera S E-Hybrid was released in the European market during the fourth quarter of 2013. Retail deliveries began in the U.S. in October 2013. , a total of 90 units were delivered in France, 86 units in the United States, 59 units in the Netherlands, 14 in Spain, and about 12 in Germany.

In the American market the 2014 model year price starts at  before any applicable government incentives. Since its introduction, 698 Panamera S E-Hybrids have been sold in the United States through August 2014. Global sales between January and August 2014 totaled over 1,500 units, presenting 9% of all Panamera models sold worldwide and 1.3% of all Porsche vehicles sold during this period.

Second generation (971 Chassis G2; 2016–present) 

The second generation Panamera was revealed on 28 June 2016 at a special event in Berlin, Germany. Codenamed 971, it is  longer,  wider and  taller than the first generation Panamera, with a  longer wheelbase. The interior features a redesigned dashboard layout, with touch-sensitive surfaces replacing the previous generation's array of buttons. A centrally mounted tachometer also harks back to the 1955 Porsche 356 A.

The new car includes two seven-inch displays in place of the dials, as well as a 12.3-inch touchscreen featuring online sat-nav, Apple CarPlay integration and an updated voice control system. Under the bonnet is a new engine range, with only the Panamera 4S, 4S Diesel and flagship Turbo available from launch.

In March 2017, Porsche unveiled the Panamera Turbo S E-Hybrid, a plug-in hybrid for the 2018 model year. The Turbo S E-Hybrid will receive the 4.0 L V8 engine from the Panamera Turbo, but will also be paired with an electric motor. Total system power will be , which makes it the third most powerful Porsche ever, after the 918 Spyder and 991 GT2RS.

In August 2017, Panamera 4S Diesel and Panamera Sport Turismo 4S Diesel were deleted from Porsche's German website and configurator. The German automotive magazine, Auto motor und sport, discovered the higher than permittable amount, which is one-and-half times more than legal limit, during the exhaust testing. The issue was with SCR catalysator and urea injection. In September 2018 Porsche announced that the company had decided to no longer offer diesel propulsion in future.

Exterior design 
The second-gen Panamera no longer has its predecessor's oft-criticized hatchback wagon styling, with the tail of the new vehicle developing a clear link to the Porsche 911 through the full width rear LED light bar, and the sharply creased tail and upper bumper. This improvement in design has helped clarify the model's identity as a sports-oriented GT car.

Sport Turismo 
In Europe a 5-door, shooting-brake estate variant, called the Sport Turismo, will be offered alongside the liftback/fastback saloon. It will also be available in the United States. The Panamera Sport Turismo debuted in March 2017 at the Geneva Motor Show, and is currently available with the same engine range as the 4-door car. In September 2017 Porsche announced the Panamera Turbo S E-Hybrid Sport Turismo, the 5-door estate version of the flagship Turbo S E-Hybrid, which had previously only been available as a 4-door configuration. As of September 2017, the  Panamera Turbo S E-Hybrid Sport Turismo is currently the world's most powerful stock estate car, besting the  Mercedes-AMG E 63 S and the  Audi RS6 Performance.

Engines

Performance

Reception 
Despite the differences in dimensions and design, a reviewer noted that the Panamera's driving dynamics were close to that of the 911, and it "seems to occupy the no-man's-land between really good sports sedans and proper sports cars", and so far the Panamera has won some comparison tests against other four-door performance cars on the market such as the Maserati Quattroporte and Aston Martin Rapide. Function was also praised, with the  hatchback trunk, and the four-corner adaptive air suspension that retained superior handling while also providing a comfortable ride for public roads.

Unlike most of the V8-engined contemporaries, all models of the Panamera avoid the US Gas Guzzler Tax.

However, CAR magazine of the U.K. described the S model as lacking sportiness, which they attributed to their test car's being "about as oriented to comfort as it’s possible to get" and called the Turbo model "a missed opportunity on behalf of Porsche" to be "the world’s first lightweight four seater" as the top model weighs as much as an Audi S8.

The 30 November 2008 edition of BBC's Top Gear featured a look at the Panamera in its news section, with the three presenters being very critical of the look. In the June 2009 edition, Richard Hammond and James May were seen driving the Panamera along the A30 in Devon, Great Britain. They were racing against a letter sent via Royal Mail between the Isles of Scilly and the Orkney Islands.

Sales 
As of 2011, the largest national market was the United States with 6188 sold.  Sales by cities: Los Angeles (890), New York (760), Hong Kong (300), Dubai (285), Tokyo (223), Munich (206), Moscow (203), Shanghai (188), Hamburg (117) and Berlin (108).  Sales internationally by model variant: Panamera 4S (9394), Turbo (6171), S (4563) and V6 (2390—introduced weeks earlier).

In 2012, U.S. sales of the Panamera totaled 7614 and Canadian sales of the Panamera totaled 422. In 2017, most of the Panameras sold in Northern Europe were hybrids.

Publicity 

On 20 April 2007, a spy video of the Porsche Panamera became available on the Internet.

In September 2008, Porsche released the first teaser image for the Panamera. In early October 2008, an undisguised Panamera was captured on film in Busan, South Korea.

On 28 November 2008, Porsche sent a mailer containing two photos of the Panamera which were labeled as "the first official images of the Porsche Panamera" with an invitation to have online access to Porsche USA's website.

On 19 April 2009, Porsche finally unveiled the Porsche Panamera sedan to the public at the 2009 Shanghai Auto Show.  One of the highlights of the Panamera's debut was fitting the car in the freight elevator of the Shanghai World Financial Center and sending it to the skyscraper's 94th floor.

An estate version concept of the Panamera was introduced at the 2012 Paris Motor Show called Sport Turismo. Powered by an advancement of Porsche's current hybrid system utilized in the Panamera S Hybrid, the Sport Turismo concept's new "e-Hybrid" system uses the 333-horsepower, supercharged 3.0-litre V6 and a 95-horsepower electric motor for 416 combined horses and a 30-kilometer electric range. As opposed to the current production system, this e-Hybrid setup prioritizes all-electric motivation unless the driver instructs the car otherwise. The Sport Turismo is technically a plug-in hybrid since the lithium-ion battery pack can be fully charged in as little as 2.5 hours when plugged into a wall outlet. Porsche declares that the combined powertrain is proficient for 0– acceleration in less than six seconds, and that the Sport Turismo can exceed  while running purely on electric power. In 2010, a variant for Taxis named "Taxamera" was created.

References

External links 

 Porsche Panamera official microsite
 2010 Porsche Panamera article at LeftLaneNews.com
 "The most expensive Panamera almost tops 200,000 Euros"—Porsche Panamera article at AutoEvolution.com

Panamera
Cars introduced in 2009
2010s cars
2020s cars
Executive cars
Full-size vehicles
Hatchbacks
Station wagons
Rear-wheel-drive vehicles
All-wheel-drive vehicles
Grand tourers
Flagship vehicles
Plug-in hybrid vehicles
Partial zero-emissions vehicles
Vehicles with four-wheel steering